Malcolm Edward Yapp (born 29 May 1931) is a British historian, professor emeritus of modern history of Western Asia at the School of Oriental and African Studies in London.

Works
 'Two British historians of Persia', in Bernard Lewis & Peter Malcolm Holt, eds., Historians of the Middle East, 1962.
 (ed. with V. J. Parry) War, technology and society in the Middle East, 1975.
 (ed. with David Taylor) Political identity in South Asia, 1979.
 Chingis Khan and the Mongol Empire, 1980.
 Strategies of British India: Britain, Iran, and Afghanistan, 1798–1850, 1980.
 The making of the modern Near East, 1792–1923, 1987.
 'Europe in the Turkish mirror', Past and Present, 137 (1992), pp. 134–55.
 The Near East since the First World War: a History to 1995, 1991.
 (ed.) Politics and diplomacy in Egypt: the diaries of Sir Miles Lampson 1935–1937, 1997.
 'The Legend of the Great Game'. Proceedings of the British Academy, no. 111, 2001, pp. 179–198.

References

1931 births
Living people
British historians
Historians of the Middle East
Academics of SOAS University of London